Banksia tenuis is a species of shrub that is endemic to the southwest of Western Australia. It has pinnatifid, serrated or smooth-edges leaves, golden brown and cream-coloured flowers in heads of about fifty-five and glabrous, egg-shaped follicles.

Description
The leaves are curved or bent, sometimes pinnatifid or serrated with up to twenty teeth on each side, or with smooth edges.

Taxonomy and naming
This species was first formally described in 1810 by Robert Brown who gave it the name Dryandra tenuifolia and published the description in the Transactions of the Linnean Society of London.

In 1996, Alex George described two varieties of Dryandra tenuifolia:
 Dryandra tenuifolia var. reptans, a more or less prostrate shrub with leaves that are smooth-edged, or only serrated near the tip;
 Dryandra tenuifolia var. tenuifolia, a bushy, more or less erect shrub with leaves that are pinnatifid or serrated for at least most of their length.

In 2007 all Dryandra species were transferred to Banksia by Austin Mast and Kevin Thiele, and this species became Banksia tenuis and the varieties reptans and tenuis respectively. As the name Banksia tenuifolia had already been published in reference to the plant now known as Hakea sericea (needlebush), Mast and Thiele had to choose a new specific epithet; their choice, "tenuis", retains the original names' use of the Latin tenuis ("thin"), in reference to the narrow leaves.

Distribution and habitat
Banksia tenuis grows in kwongan and is widespread between Darkan, Williams and the Cape Arid National Park. The autonym, var. tenuis is found between Kamballup in the Stirling Range National Park and Cape Arid, and var. reptans between Darkan, Williams and Jerramungup.

Ecology
An assessment of the potential impact of climate change on this species found that its range is likely to contract by between 30% and 80% by 2080, depending on the severity of the change.

Conservation status
Banksia tenuis and both varieties of the species are classified as "not threatened" by the Western Australian Government Department of Parks and Wildlife.

References

 

tenuis
Plants described in 1810
Taxa named by Robert Brown (botanist, born 1773)